HD 1461 is a star in the equatorial constellation of Cetus, near the western constellation border with Aquarius. It has the Gould designation 32 G. Ceti, while HD 1461 is the Henry Draper Catalogue identifier. This object has a yellow hue and is a challenge to view with the naked eye, having an apparent visual magnitude of 6.47.

This object is a G-type main-sequence star with a stellar classification of G3VFe0.5, where the suffix notation indicates a mild overabundance of iron. It is roughly two billion years old and is spinning with a projected rotational velocity of 5 km/s. This is a solar-type star with 5% greater mass compared to the Sun and 1.24 times the Sun's radius. The star is radiating 1.19 times the luminosity of the Sun from its photosphere at an effective temperature of 5,386 K.

Planetary system
On 14 December 2009, scientists announced the discovery at least one planet orbiting around HD 1461. The planet, a super-Earth with a 5.8-day orbit was designated HD 1461 b. The data also contained evidence for additional planets with orbital periods of around 400 and 5000 days but the star showed small variations with similar periods, casting doubt on the interpretation of these signals as being caused by orbiting planets.

In 2011, a paper was published on the arXiv pre-print server giving an orbital solution incorporating data from the HARPS spectrograph. This solution recovered the previously-known planet HD 1461 b, and an additional planet in a 13.5-day orbit. The 13.5-day planet HD 1461 c was confirmed in 2015.

Other than HD 1461 b, the designations for the planets are inconsistent: in the original paper, Rivera et al. designated the 400 and 5000-day candidates as "c" and "d" respectively, whereas the Mayor et al. (2011) pre-print uses the "c" designation for the 13.5-day planet and does not mention the 400-day or 5000-day planets at all.

HD 1461 b has a mass 6.44 times that of the Earth while HD 1461 c has a mass times 5.59 that of the Earth.

See also
 List of extrasolar planets
 List of stars in Cetus

References

External links
 Aladin image of HD 1461

G-type main-sequence stars
Planetary systems with two confirmed planets
Cetus (constellation)
BD-08 0038
0016.1, 9009
001461
001499
0072
J00184182-0803105